Wheeler County is a county in the U.S. state of Oregon. As of the 2020 census, the population was 1,451, making it Oregon's least populous county. It is named in honor of Henry H. Wheeler. an early settler who owned a farm near Mitchell. The county seat is Fossil, and Wheeler County is known for having Oregon's largest deposit of fossils.

History
Wheeler County was created on February 17, 1899, from parts of Grant, Gilliam, and Crook Counties. There have been no boundary changes since its creation. Fossil was designated the temporary county seat at the time of the county's creation. In 1900 there was an election to determine the permanent county seat between the three towns of the county, which ended with Fossil winning the election.

Henry H. Wheeler (born September 7, 1826, Erie County, Pennsylvania - died March 26, 1915, Mitchell, Oregon) arrived in Oregon in 1862, moved around, and settled near Mitchell, Oregon. He married Dorcas L. Monroe on 19 December 1875.

Geography

Adjacent counties
Gilliam County - north
Morrow County - northeast
Grant County - east
Crook County - south
Jefferson County - west
Wasco County - northwest

National Protected Areas
 John Day Fossil Beds National Monument (part)
 Ochoco National Forest (part)
 Umatilla National Forest (part)

Major highway
U.S. Route 26
Oregon Route 19

Demographics

2000 census
As of the census of 2000, there were 1,547 people, 653 households, and 444 families living in the county.  The population density was 1 people per square mile (0/km2).  There were 842 housing units at an average density of 0 per square mile (0/km2).  The racial makeup of the county was 93.34% White, 0.06% Black or African American, 0.84% Native American, 0.26% Asian, 0.06% Pacific Islander, 3.49% from other races, and 1.94% from two or more races.  5.11% of the population were Hispanic or Latino of any race. 20.6% were of German, 18.0% English, 13.6% American, 8.2% Irish and 6.9% Scottish ancestry.

There were 653 households, out of which 21.30% had children under the age of 18 living with them, 62.20% were married couples living together, 4.00% had a female householder with no husband present, and 31.90% were non-families. 27.40% of all households were made up of individuals, and 13.30% had someone living alone who was 65 years of age or older.  The average household size was 2.32 and the average family size was 2.76.

In the county, the population was spread out, with 22.70% under the age of 18, 3.40% from 18 to 24, 19.30% from 25 to 44, 31.40% from 45 to 64, and 23.30% who were 65 years of age or older.  The median age was 48 years. For every 100 females there were 102.20 males.  For every 100 females age 18 and over, there were 97.00 males.

The median income for a household in the county was $28,750, and the median income for a family was $34,048. Males had a median income of $29,688 versus $22,361 for females. The per capita income for the county was $15,884.  About 12.70% of families and 15.60% of the population were below the poverty line, including 22.20% of those under age 18 and 4.20% of those age 65 or over.

2010 census
As of the 2010 census, there were 1,441 people, 651 households, and 408 families living in the county. The racial makeup of the county was 92.4% white, 1.2% American Indian, 0.6% Asian, 0.1% Pacific islander, 2.6% from other races, and 3.1% from two or more races. Those of Hispanic or Latino origin made up 4.3% of the population. In terms of ancestry, 28.4% were German, 24.0% were English, 20.0% were Irish, and 8.4% were American.

Of the 651 households, 20.3% had children under the age of 18 living with them, 51.9% were married couples living together, 7.2% had a female householder with no husband present, 37.3% were non-families, and 32.4% of all households were made up of individuals. The average household size was 2.18 and the average family size was 2.70. The median age was 53.0 years.

The median income for a household in the county was $33,403 and the median income for a family was $43,167. Males had a median income of $36,328 versus $31,792 for females. The per capita income for the county was $20,598. About 9.1% of families and 11.4% of the population were below the poverty line, including 12.0% of those under age 18 and 5.7% of those age 65 or over.

Politics

Though Wheeler County is located in central Oregon, politically it falls in line with the eastern side of the state. The majority of registered voters who are part of a political party in Wheeler County, as well as most counties in eastern Oregon, are members of the Republican Party, and the last Democrat to win a majority in the county was Jimmy Carter in 1976. No Democrat has won over 40 percent of the vote in Wheeler County since 1988 with that election having been heavily influenced by drought.

In the 2008 presidential election, 61.33% of Wheeler County voters voted for Republican John McCain, while 34.61% voted for Obama and 4.06% of voters either voted for a Third Party candidate or wrote in a candidate. In the 2004 presidential election, 69.5% of Wheeler Country voters voted for George W. Bush, while 27.8% voted for John Kerry, and 2.7% of voters either voted for a Third Party candidate or wrote in a candidate.

In the 2016 presidential election, 72.25 percent of voters went for Republican Donald Trump, 18.95 percent for Democrat Hillary Clinton, 5.62 percent for Libertarian Gary Johnson, and the remainder were either write-ins or voted for other candidates. In the 2012 presidential election, 63.52 percent of voters went for Mitt Romney, 31.00 percent for Barack Obama and 5.48 percent for other candidates.

Economy
Principal industries in this county are agriculture, livestock, and lumber.

Communities

Cities
Fossil (county seat)
Mitchell
Spray

Unincorporated communities

Antone
Clarno
Richmond
Service Creek
Spoos Mill
Twickenham
Waterman
Wetmore
City of Wheeler (had a post office Aug 1890-Sept 1895)
Winlock

Ghost town
Kinzua

Education
School districts include:
 Condon School District 25J
 Dayville School District 16J
 Fossil School District 21J
 Mitchell School District 55
 Spray School District 1

The county is not a part of a community college district.

See also
National Register of Historic Places listings in Wheeler County, Oregon
Winlock W. Steiwer

References

Further reading

External links

Wheeler County Oregon (official website)
Wheeler County listing in the Oregon Blue Book

 
1899 establishments in Oregon
Populated places established in 1899